Roy Tasco Davis (June 4, 1889December 27, 1975) was an American diplomat who served as ambassador to Costa Rica, Haiti, Panama.

Born in Ewing, Missouri, on June 4, 1889, Davis received his education from the public schools of Missouri, and from Brown University, from which he graduated in 1910.

Nominated by President Warren G. Harding on February 7, 1922, to become minister to Costa Rica, he served in that position from 1922 to 1930.

After service abroad, Davis served as a member of the Maryland State Senate from 1947 to 1951.

He later served as ambassador to Haiti during the administration of Dwight D. Eisenhower.

Roy Tasco Davis died on December 27, 1975, in Silver Spring, Maryland, at the age of 86.

References

1889 births
1975 deaths
Ambassadors of the United States to Panama
Ambassadors of the United States to Haiti
Ambassadors of the United States to Costa Rica
Maryland state senators
Brown University alumni
People from Lewis County, Missouri
20th-century American politicians
20th-century American diplomats